Harsola village is located in Kaithal Tehsil of Kaithal district in Haryana, India. As per 2009 stats, Harsola village is also a gram panchayat.

Demographics
Most of the population of the village is Hindu and widely spoken language is Haryanvi.

Schools
 Govt. Sr. Secondary School.
 MTM(master tek chand memorial) Public School
 Saraswati Public School

Transportation
The nearby Railway stations to Harsola village are New Kaithal Halt Railway station (NKLE) and Kaithal Railway station (KLE).

From Kaithal bus stand, bus services are also available to Delhi, Hisar, Chandigarh, Jammu and many other places.

References 

Villages in Kaithal district